Maramangalathupatti is a census town in Salem district in the Indian state of Tamil Nadu.

Demographics
 India census, Maramangalathupatti had a population of 11,378. Males constitute 51% of the population and females 49%. Maramangalathupatti has an average literacy rate of 69%, higher than the national average of 59.5%: male literacy is 74%, and female literacy is 63%. In Maramangalathupatti, 11% of the population is under 6 years of age.

References

Cities and towns in Salem district